Wayne J. Keeley (born Wayne Joseph Keeley) is a practicing attorney, author, professor, producer and director.  He has produced, written, and directed documentaries, commercials and educational programs, in addition to screenplays, stage plays, and teleplays.

Biography
Wayne J. Keeley was born in Yonkers, New York.  He graduated summa cum laude and phi beta kappa from Fordham College in 1978.  He was awarded a St. Thomas More Scholarship to St. John's School of Law.  Keeley graduated from St. John's School of Law with a Juris Doctor (J.D.) degree in 1981.  Keeley received a Masters of Laws (LL.M) from New York University School of Law in 1990.

Keeley began his legal career as an Associate Attorney at Wilson Elser Moskowitz Edelman & Dicker from 1980 to 1985.  Keeley litigated cases at the trial and appellate level.  Most notably, Keeley successfully defended a medical malpractice case at the Court of Appeals of New York in Innis v. State of New York et al., 60 N.Y.2d 653, 467 N.Y.S.2d 830, 455 N.E.2d 483 (1983). He is admitted to practice law before the courts of New York State, the United States District Court for the Southern District of New York, the United States District Court for the Eastern District of New York, the United States Court of Appeals for the Second Circuit and the Supreme Court of the United States.

In 2000, Keeley joined the National Advertising Division (NAD) of the Council of Better Business Bureaus, Inc. He was the Assistant Director of Development at NAD until 2007 and authored over 100 NAD decisions published in the NAD/CARU Case Reports.

In 2007, Keeley was appointed the director of the Children's Advertising Review Unit (CARU) of the Council of Better Business Bureaus, Inc. In 2008, he was made a vice president of the Council of Better Business Bureaus, Inc.

Keeley began his film career in 1985 at Bennu Productions where he wrote, produced and directed educational films, documentaries, commercials and music videos in addition to serving as general counsel and vice president.  He won many awards for his productions including two Emmy Awards for Public Service Announcements.  In 1998, Keeley moved to Arrow Entertainment where he wrote and produced Nosferatu - The First Vampire.

Keeley's documentary, 10th Gear Jettride:  3800 Miles to a Cure, won Best Feature Documentary at the 2009 Hollywood East Film Festival.  The film documents the journey of 25 teen cyclists who rode 3800 miles across America to raise money for those children with Duchenne muscular dystrophy.

Keeley has also taught law and communications at Baruch College, Bronx Community College, Fordham College, Audrey Cohen College and Western Connecticut State University.

Books
Mahogany Row (2001)
The Titanic Chronicles (1999)(co-produced with James Scura) Bennu Multimedia, Inc. (1999), audiobook.
Deadraiser: Part I: Horror in Jordan's Bank, (co-authored with Stephanie C. Lyons-Keeley) Someday Productions LLC (2016)
Going All In (co authored with Stephanie C..Lyons-Keeley) Melange Books LLC (2017)

Articles
"Evidence-Based Dental Advertising and Self-Regulations:  A Perspective by the National Advertising Division," The Journal of Evidence-Based Dental Practice, Volume 4, No 1, March 2004.
"Avoiding Dismissal in a Legal Malpractice Case," by Wayne J. Keeley and Thomas W. Hyland, National Journal, Vol. 5, No. 51.
"Using the Structured Settlement," by Wayne J. Keeley and James L. Fischer, National Law Journal, Vol. 6, No. 15.
"Professional Liability and the Expert," by Wayne J. Keeley and Thomas W. Hyland, National Law Journal, Vol. 6, No. 42.
"Labor Law Sec. 222:  Held Violative of Privileges and Immunities Clause," St. John's Law Review, Vol. 54, No. 4 by Wayne J. Keeley and Rose DiMartino
"CPL Sec30(4)(G)" Court Congestion Not 'Exceptional Circumstance' Excusing Prosecutor's Failure to be Ready," St. John's Law Review, Vol. 55, No. 1, by Wayne J. Keeley
"CARU Cares, and So Should You" by Wayne J. Keeley and Jay G. Black. The Association of Media & Entertainment Counsel (AMEC) Winter 2010.

Filmography (as director & writer)
Films

Kissy Cousins Monster Babies and Morphing Elvis (The Short) (2018) Someday Productions/Siberian Films
The History of Everything Circa 1993 F/K/A Kissy Cousins Monster Babies and Morphing Elvis (2018) Someday Productions/Siberian Films
Kissy Cousins Monster Babies (Director's Cut) (2018) Someday Productions/Siberian Films
Nosferatu: The First Vampire (1998) Arrow Entertainment.  Host:  David Carradine; Music by Type O Negative.

Documentaries
Crackdown on Drugs (1988) 60 min., Bennu Productions, Inc. Host:  Scott Valentine. (co-produced with Paul Daniel Sansone; co-written with Paul Daniel Sansone, Kevin Cavaliere and Ron Soffer; co-directed with Paul Daniel Sansone and Randy Leeds) 
Icy Death (1991) 30 min., Bennu Productions, Inc., Host:  Colin Quinn
Evolution's End? The Clearcut Facts (1992) 60 min., Bennu productions, Inc., Narrated by Carole King. Featuring appearances by John Oates, River Phoenix and Bob Weir
Point of No Return:  The War in the Gulf (1992) 60 min., Bennu Productions, Inc.  Host: Lawrence Luckinbill.  (1991).
Earthday Everyday (1992) 60 min., Bennu Productions, Inc.  Narrated by Dennis Weaver.
The Titanic Chronicles (1999) Bennu Multimedia, Inc., Host:  David McCallum. (co-produced with James Scura).
10th Gear Jettride:  3800 Miles to a Cure (2009) The Jett Foundation, (Co-produced with Craig Dobson; co-written with Anthony Geathers; directed by Anthony Geathers)

Public Service Announcements
Would You Know If Someone Was Following Your Child Online? (2017) Sponsor: Council of Better Business Bureaus, Inc.
Do You Know Where Your Children Are...on the Internet? (2010) Sponsor: Council of Better Business Bureaus, Inc.
Why Does He Fall Down So Much (2007) Sponsor: Parent Project for Muscular Dystrophy (PPMD)
It's Up To You (1995) Music Video PSA and 30 Minute Program, Sponsor: New York State (Mario Cuomo)(Emmy Award winner)Featuring appearances by Doug E. Fresh, Harry Belafonte, Jasmine Guy, Billy Baldwin, Julie Brown and the cast from Grease.
Injury Control (1994) Sponsor: New York State Department of Health
My Older Brother (1991) Sponsor: 1-800-Cocaine (Emmy Award winner)
Problems (1991) Sponsor:  1-800-Cocaine (Emmy Nominee)

Educational Programs
"Interview Techniques and Resume Tips for the Job Applicant," (1985) 60 min., Bennu Productions, Inc., (co-written and co-produced with Kevin Cavaliere)
"Poise and the Art of Job Interviewing," (1987) 30 min., Bennu Productions, Inc., (co written and co-produced with Kevin Cavaliere)
"Preparing for the Job Interview," (1987) 30 min., Bennu Productions, Inc., (co-written and co-produced with Kevin Cavaliere)
"Everyman:  A Modern Adaptation," (1990) 60 min., Bennu Productions, Inc
"The Job Hunter's Resource Guide," (1990) 60 min., Bennu Productions, Inc., Host: Bob Levey (co-produced and co-directed with Chris Austermann; co-written with Chris Austermann and Lawrence A. Reid)
"The Art of Telecommunication," (1990) 20 min., Bennu Productions, Inc.
"Reduce, Reuse & Recycle," (1991) 30 min., Bennu Productions, Inc.
"Say No To Strangers," (1991) 30 min., Bennu Productions, Inc.  Host:  Carlo Imperato 
"Discovering Columbus," (1992) 30 min., Bennu Productions, Inc.
"Ancient Rome:  An Overview," (1992) 20 min., Bennu Productions, Inc.
"Ancient Rome:  Lifestyles and Customs," (1992) 20 min., Bennu Productions, Inc.
"The Rise of Rome," (1992) 20 min., Bennu Productions, Inc.
"The Roman Empire 300 A.D. to 200 A.D.," (1992) 20 min., Bennu Productions, Inc.
"The Fall of Rome 200 A.D. to 640 A.D.," (1992) 20 min., Bennu Productions, Inc.
"Russia Then and Now," (1992), Bennu Productions, Inc.
"The Revolutionary War," (1992) 30 min., Bennu Productions, Inc.
"The Civil War," (1992) 30 min., Bennu Productions, Inc.
"Native Americans – An Overview," (1992) 30 min., Bennu Productions, Inc.
"España y la conquista de las Américas," (1994) 30 min., Bennu Productions, Inc., Narrated in Spanish by Sergio Maclean.  Written and Produced by Wayne J. Keeley.
"Puerto Rico Today," (1994) 40 min., English and Spanish, Bennu Productions, Inc., Narrated in Spanish by Sergio Maclean.  Written and Produced by Wayne J. Keeley.

Plays
"Commuters" (co-authored with Stephanie C. Lyons-Keeley)(2009, 2015) Someday Productions 
Waiting For The Sun (co-authored with Stephanie C. Lyons-Keeley)(2009, 2016) Someday Productions 
"Life As She Knows It" (co-authored with Stephanie C. Lyons-Keeley)(2015) Someday Productions
"Heaven Sent" (co-authored with Stephanie C. Lyons-Keeley)(2015) Someday Productions

Awards and nominations
[https://www.imdb.com/title/tt1378170/ 10th Gear Jettride: 3800 Miles to a Cure] (2009) Best Feature Documentary 2009 Co-Producer, Hollywood East Film Festival
It's Up To You (1995) Emmy Award, Silver Award - Producer, WorldFest - Houston International Film Festival
Point of No Return: The War in the Gulf (1992) The Bronze Award – Producer, Columbus International Film and Video Festival
My Older Brother (1991) Emmy Award, The Chris Award -Producer, Columbus International Film and Video Festival, Certificate for Outstanding Creativity – The Mobius Advertising Awards
Problems (1991) Emmy Award Nominee
Icy Death (1991) Honorable Mention – Columbus International Film and Video Festival
Crackdown on Drugs (1988) Producer, Silver Apple Award -  National Educational Film & Video Festival
Mahogany Row (2001) Frankfurt eBook Award Nominee

References

External links

www.caru.org
Bio on FOSI.org
MediaLawMan
Twitter @Medialawman

Living people
American lawyers
American male writers
American film producers
1956 births
Bronx Community College faculty